Krajišnik is Serbian surname. The name is derived from the Serbian language term krajina or krajište that had originally served as an administrative unit of the Serbian Empire or Despotate to designate border regions where the emperor or despot had not established solid and firm control due to raids from hostile neighboring provinces. The Albanian variant of the surname is Kreshnik.

Notable people with Krajišnik surname include:
 Damjan Krajišnik
 Momčilo Krajišnik
 Munever Krajišnik

See also 
 Krajišnik (disambiguation)
 Bosanska Krajina
 Bosansko Krajište
 Krajišnik (Gradiška)
 NK Krajišnik Velika Kladuša

References 

Serbian surnames
Toponymic surnames